Forever People are a group of extraterrestrial superheroes appearing in American comic books published by DC Comics. They first appeared in Forever People #1 (cover-dated February–March 1971), and were created by Jack Kirby as part of his "Fourth World" epic.

Publication history
The protagonists of the series are a group of young New Gods from New Genesis who were on a mission to oppose Darkseid on Earth, and talked, dressed, and acted much like the flower children of the 1960s. In addition to the individual abilities and equipment of the members, the group can join together using the technology of a Mother Box to summon the powerful hero known as the Infinity-Man. The group travels by use of their Super-Cycle. The first issue of their title also introduced the Boom Tube.

Their own title, The Forever People, debuted in 1971 and lasted 11 issues. They mainly fought Darkseid's forces, such as Glorious Godfrey in issue #3. Issues #9 and 10 guest-starred Deadman; according to writer/artist Jack Kirby's assistant Mark Evanier: "We were ordered to put Deadman into New Gods, but we slipped him into Forever People instead, where he was a little less obtrusive. Jack didn't like the character and didn't want to do it. He didn't feel he should be doing someone else's character. ... He doesn't want to trample on someone else's vision. Carmine [Infantino, DC Comics publisher and Deadman's co-creator] said the character hadn't sold and he wanted the Kirby touch on it". The series ended on a cliffhanger, with the Forever People stranded on Adon.

In a 1986 interview Kirby recalled "The Forever People were the wonderful people of the ’60s, who I loved. If you’ll watch the actions of the Forever People, you’ll see the reflection of the ’60s in their attitudes,
in the backgrounds, in their clothes. You’ll see the ’60s. I felt I would leave a record of the ’60s in their adventures."

In 1988, a six-issue Forever People limited series by writer J. M. DeMatteis and artist Paris Cullins was published, showing what happens to the Forever People on Adon. This series reveals that the Forever People were Earth-born humans—infants doomed to die but brought to New Genesis instead, gathered to protect the human race. They returned to Earth to oppose 'the Darkness', a sentient but disembodied force of hopelessness. They were aided by a mysterious being, Maya, who is ultimately revealed to be the consciousness of their Mother Box.

During the events of Death of the New Gods, one of the miniseries that attempted to lead into Final Crisis, the human origin of the Forever People was retconned, and it was hinted that the five were to have been the first of the next evolution of the New Gods—godlings becoming more than the sum of their parts. In the Death of the New Gods, Superman and Mister Miracle discover that the Forever People were murdered several months prior to the discovery of their bodies, and it is later revealed that an impostor posing as Himon has been murdering the New Gods as an agent for the Source; but the murderer turns out to be Infinity-Man.

In the Final Crisis Sketchbook, the Forever People (along with other members of the New Gods) are shown to be given updated looks, which Grant Morrison calls "more gothic art school student than flower power". In the event itself, Japan's pop culture team, the Super Young Team are revealed to be the Fifth World incarnation of the Forever People.

In The New 52, the series Infinity Man and the Forever People makes some changes, where Serifan is now Serafina, Vykin's sister, and Beautiful Dreamer has been renamed Dreamer Beautiful. This series was cancelled as of issue #9 (May 2015).

Original members

Beautiful Dreamer
During the original Kirby run, Beautiful Dreamer had been linked romantically to Mark Moonrider, although outside of hand-holding, the exact nature of their relationship was never directly specified. In the 1988 miniseries, it was established that Dreamer had been married to Big Bear, and together they had a child, named Maya after the spirit of their old Mother Box. Since then, their marriage and daughter has been voided by a retcon during John Byrne's Jack Kirby's Fourth World series. When last shown, Dreamer was romantically involved with Takion, the new Highfather of New Genesis.

In Superman & Batman: Generations 3, she marries Superman, and has his children, Lar-El and Vara. All three are killed by Darkseid.

Powers and abilities

Like all the children of New Genesis, Beautiful Dreamer possesses the advanced physiology of a New God; she is extremely long-lived, has a limited degree of superhuman strength, resistance and reflexes. She's a skilled hand-to-hand combatant. Also, she has psionic powers, with which she can create illusions. It seems there are no limits to the size or duration of these images. In addition, she has been able to feel the fluctuations within the Source.

Big Bear
Big Bear had been married to Beautiful Dreamer, and she had been pregnant with their daughter. A shift in time resulted in the marriage never happening and the child never having existed. This traumatized Beautiful Dreamer for a time. In Forever People #7, he was shown to have been responsible for the historical event that led to the legend of King Arthur.

Powers and abilities
A skilled hand-to-hand combatant, Big Bear is among the strongest of the children of New Genesis, making him superstrong by human standards, capable of bending steel and hurling giant redwood trees almost effortlessly. Big Bear's atomic structure is reinforced by a constant flow of so-called high-density atoms, and he is able to store an excess of free-flowing atoms which he can direct at will to reinforce the power of his already awesome punch.

Mark Moonrider
During the original Kirby run, Beautiful Dreamer had been linked romantically to Mark Moonrider, although outside of hand-holding, the exact nature of their relationship was never directly specified. In the 1988 miniseries set on Adon, Mark was shown to have fallen in love with, and later married, one of the natives, Mina. They had three children (Merry, Wendy and Starbright), but when the shift in time caused by the Darkness' actions undid the events which 'evolved' the natives, this marriage now never had occurred, leaving Mark with only his friends.

Powers and abilities
In addition to being extremely long-lived, Mark has superhuman strength, reflexes and he's very resistant to conventional injury. Also, he has a keen mind with good leadership skills and he is well-trained in hand-to-hand combat. He possesses a Megaton Touch. With it, he can cause a tremendous explosion, and no doubt he could easily kill with it if he and his companions were not sworn never to take a life. Used at low intensity, it can cause a severe shock. On one occasion he used his megaton touch to turn solid rock into molten lava.

Serifan
Serifan is the youngest member of the group. He's usually the most vulnerable. The Dark saw this and possessed Serifan, using him to conquer Forevertown and plague the Forever People. After the Dark was defeated he returned to his normal self.

Powers and abilities
Although Serifan doesn't have super-potencies, still he is stronger and more durable than any human. Also, Serifan is functionally a sensitive possessing limited telepathic powers. In his hatband Serifan carries "cosmic cartridges" that serve various purposes when wielded. For example, the cartridges can be used to create protective shock-repelli-fields, drain energy from people, create an anti-gravity effect or generate high gravitational force, modify atomic density, generate intense heat, power vehicles or to stun an opponent. Also, the cartridges tune the wielder into the "cosmic Harmony" that is linked to the Source and, in the case of the "Blue Cartridge", it manipulates the life force and allowed Deadman to merge with a "Follower" and have a body of his own once again.

Vykin
Throughout the Kirby run, Vykin was referred to as "Vykin the Black". He was the first black superhero to appear in a DC comic book, preceding Kirby's Black Racer by approximately seven months. When the Forever People were stranded on Adon, Mark Moonrider thought it would be advantageous to civilize the people of the planet. When Vykin used their Mother Box to do so, it overloaded and was destroyed, killing Vykin in the process, but managing to create Forevertown. When the Dark overtook and reversed the effects of the Mother Box, Vykin was brought back to life. Recently he was reunited on New Genesis with his mother, Valkyra the Commander, who rode a winged robotic horse. Later on, she sacrificed her life to save her lover Orion.

Powers and abilities
Like all New gods, Vykin The Black is functionally immortal and all his physical attributes are superhuman. Also, Vykin The Black possesses "Magno-Power", which enables him to project magnetic energy. He can mentally trace atomic patterns, and is therefore good at tracking. He has an intuitive grasp of the workings of complicated machinery. Vykin has a keen mind and he's a skilled hand-to-hand combatant. It is Vykin who carries the Forever People's Mother Box, a kind of sentient computer.

Infinity-Man
Infinity-Man is Drax, the older brother of Uxas, who would later become Darkseid of Apokolips, and became the Infinity-Man after treachery at the hands of Uxas while attempting to harness the Omega Force for himself. No explanation was given as to why he was involved with the Forever People other than Big Bear's offhanded comment to Superman in the first issue of "we've got an arrangement with the Infinity Man". The Infinity-Man's powers were never fully cataloged other than having some direct link to the Source. He was shown capable of flight, super-strength, enhanced vision powers, and the ability to negate gravity and convert it into a repulsive force.

Fifth World

The Super Young Team are the contemporary Fifth World incarnations of the Forever People. Created by writer Grant Morrison in the early "52" stages of their DC Universe Final Crisis storyline, they are influenced by American super-heroes and Japanese pop culture, and were first mentioned in 52 #6. This group recruits Sunny Sumo, a powerful fighter who assisted the original Forever People in the first series.

Other versions

Amalgam Comics
The Un-People are a superhero group in the Amalgam Comics universe. They are a combination of the Forever People and Marvel Comics' the Inhumans.

In other media

Television
 The Forever People make a non-speaking appearance in the Justice League episode "Twilight" Pt. 2.
 The Forever People appear in Young Justice, with Vykin voiced by Kevin Michael Richardson, Big Bear by Bill Fagerbakke, Beautiful Dreamer by Grey DeLisle, and Mark Moonrider and Serifan by Dee Bradley Baker.

Film
An alternate universe incarnation of Mark Moonrider makes a non-speaking cameo appearance in a flashback in Justice League: Gods and Monsters.

Miscellaneous
Alternate universe incarnations of the Forever People appear in the Justice League: Gods and Monsters tie-in comic book as experiments created by Doctor Psycho.

Collected editions
Jack Kirby's The Forever People collects The Forever People #1–11, 288 pages, October 1999, 
 Jack Kirby's Fourth World Omnibus
Volume 1 collects Forever People #1–3, Mister Miracle #1–3, The New Gods #1–3, Superman's Pal Jimmy Olsen #133–139, 396 pages, May 2007,  (hardcover); December 2011,  (paperback) 
Volume 2 collects Forever People #4–6, Mister Miracle #4–6, The New Gods #4–6, Superman's Pal Jimmy Olsen #141–145, 396 pages, August 2007,  (hardcover); April 2012,  (paperback)
Volume 3 collects Forever People #7–10, Mister Miracle #7–9, The New Gods #7–10, Superman's Pal Jimmy Olsen #146–148, 396 pages, November 2007,  (hardcover); August 2012,  (paperback)
Volume 4 collects Forever People #11; Mister Miracle #10–18; The New Gods #11; "Even Gods Must Die" from The New Gods vol. 2 #6; DC Graphic Novel #4: "The Hunger Dogs"; "On the Road to Armagetto!" (previously unpublished), 424 pages, March 2008,  (hardcover); December 2012,  (paperback)

See also
 Jack Kirby bibliography

References

External links
 DCU Guide: Forever People
 Forever People at Mike's Amazing World of Comics
 Index to the Earth-1 Fourth World stories

1971 comics debuts
1972 comics endings
1988 comics debuts
1988 comics endings
2014 comics debuts
2015 comics endings
Characters created by Jack Kirby
Comics characters introduced in 1971
DC Comics aliens
DC Comics characters with superhuman strength
DC Comics extraterrestrial superheroes
DC Comics deities
DC Comics superhero teams
DC Comics titles
Defunct American comics
New Gods of New Genesis